Polygonum paronychia is a species of flowering plant in the knotweed family known by the common names dune knotweed, black knotweed, and beach knotweed. It is native to the coastline of western North America from British Columbia to California, where it grows in sandy coastal habitat such as beaches, dunes, and scrub.

Description
Polygonum paronychia is a small prostrate or upright shrub producing multibranched brown stems up to a meter (40 inches) long. The stems may root at nodes that come in contact with moist substrate. The leaves are alternately arranged on the stems but are mostly located bunched around the tips of the stem branches. The leaves are linear to lance-shaped with rolled edges and bristly midribs on the undersides. Each leaf has a large stipule which forms a wide, membranous ochrea. The ochrea is up to 2 centimeters (0.8 inches) long and is persistent, fraying into fibrous, silvery shreds that remain on the plant through the seasons. Flowers occur in the leaf axils. Each is up to a centimeter (0.4 inches) wide with five narrow white or pinkish corolla lobes.

Uses 
The plant has been made into a poultice to treat whitlow infections.

References

External links
Jepson Manual Treatment
Calphotos Photo gallery, University of California

paronychia
Flora of the West Coast of the United States
Flora of British Columbia
Plants described in 1828
Flora without expected TNC conservation status